Fresh FM is a Dutch regional, commercial radio station transmitted through air in the regions of Greater Amsterdam, Utrecht, Haaglanden and Rhine/Haarlemmermeer. It broadcasts for free via the Internet. Fresh FM's programming is primarily dance music and is very diverse within that genre. The station's target audience is 17- to 49-year-olds and it is one of the most listened to regional radio stations. It is based in The Hague. Fresh FM has existed for several years and got a lot during the Zerobase in 2003 with the broadcasting territories of North Holland (Amsterdam, Haarlem and Haarlemmermeer), South Holland (The Hague, Leiden and Alphen) and the city Utrecht. Fresh FM's slogans are "Feel good!" and "It's all about the music".

DJs
Erwin van der Bliek
Michel de Hey
Mark van Dale
Peter van Leeuwen
Gijs Alkemade
Marcello & Paolo Jay
Peter Teunisse
Frank Schildkamp
Dominic Schep
Frank van Huussen
Norman
Cor de Splinter - *Gizmo - *Darkraver
Jurgen Rijkers - DJ Jurgen
Wytske Kenemans
John Digweed
Ferry Corsten
Chard
Frank Schildkamp
Norman
Adam Beyer
Paul van Dyk
Carl Cox
Above & Beyond
Artento Divini
DJ Jean

Programs
Turbulentie 2.0
mix at 6
DJ Jean @ Work
Dance Files
Group Therapy
Club Fresh
Hardhouse Generation
ID
Corsten's Countdown
Fresh Feel Good 40 - hitlist with the 40 most played hits of last week.
Weekend Afterparty

The other disc jockeys have a program with the same name.

External links
Official home page (in Dutch)
Fresh FM - Weekly Programming (in Dutch)

Radio stations in the Netherlands